Charlie Baker is a British comedian, actor, singer and presenter.

Early and personal life
Baker is from Newton Abbot, Devon in the south west of England.

Career

Comedy
As a comedy performer Baker has frequently showcased his singing skills. In his 2011 play ‘Wedding Band’ he played the singer in a wedding band. In ‘Bakers Dozen’ he sang best-selling number ones from every year between 2000 and 2012. The show was initially performed at the 2013 Edinburgh Festival before being toured around the UK. At the 2016 Edinburgh Festival Baker's show was called Just the One and  celebrated his only child and one-hit wonders. His 2017 show The Hit Polisher honoured hits from the 80s, 90s, and 00s and their associated memories.
2018 Edinburgh Baker performed in a children's play called The Greatest Goat of All Time.

Radio
An avid sports fan Baker presents on TalkSport
Baker supports Torquay United FC and presents The National Obsession podcast about his experiences supporting Torquay. He has guested on football podcast Quickly Kevin, Will He Score? Baker has also appeared  on BBC Radio shows Fighting Talk, and The Horne Section. He has appeared as a guest on the Two Shot Podcast.

Actor
As an actor he has had minor roles in sitcoms including Miranda and The IT Crowd. He has been as a team captain on the Channel 4 panel show ‘A Short History Of Everything Else’. He also became a regular guest on Richard Bacon's Beer & Pizza Club, and won Let's Dance For Comic Relief in 2011. Baker has also appeared in EastEnders, Doctors, Doctor Who and The Boy in the Striped Pyjamas.

References

External links
 

Living people
English male comedians
English male television actors
21st-century English comedians
Year of birth missing (living people)